White Oak Run may refer to:

A former name for Archbald, Pennsylvania
White Oak Run (Lackawanna River)
White Oak Run (Roaring Brook)
White Oak Run (Loyalhanna Creek tributary), a stream in Westmoreland County, Pennsylvania